Independent Division of Ningxia Provincial Military District was formed in July 1966 from the Public Security Contingent of Ningxia province. The division was composed of three regiments (1st to 3rd).

In May 1969, all three regiments of the division exchanged position and designation with other units:
1st Infantry Regiment exchanged with 4th Independent Infantry Regiment of Qinghai Provincial Military District;
2nd Infantry Regiment exchanged with 5th Independent Infantry Regiment of Shannxi Provincial Military District;
3rd Infantry Regiment exchanged with 1st Independent Infantry Regiment of Gansu Provincial Military District.

In March 1976 1st Infantry Regiment was re-organized as Artillery Regiment; 6th Independent Infantry Regiment of Qinghai Provincial Military District was attached to the division as new 1st Infantry Regiment.

In February 1981 the division was renamed as 3rd Garrison Division of Lanzhou Military Region().

In September 1985 the division was disbanded.

References

G3L
Military units and formations established in 1966
Military units and formations disestablished in 1985